A flight spare is a copy of a spacecraft or spacecraft part which is held in reserve in case it is needed for the mission. Flight spares are built to the same specifications as the original equipment (the "flight model"), and can be substituted in the case of damage or other problems with the flight model, reducing launch delays. The extra cost of building a flight spare can be justified by the enormous cost of delaying a launch by even a short amount of time.

Primary function

Flight spares are constructed as contingencies. As such, spare parts may be swapped onto a craft before launch, or completed spare spacecraft may be launched if the flight model is lost.

NASA has two basic types of spares, development spares and operational spares.  NASA makes a determination about which parts need spares based on whether parts are custom built, and the lead-time for procurement. It also makes determinations about the quantities of spares, based on whether the part is critical to system operation, failure rate, and the expected life of the part.

The flight spare can also be useful during a space mission if a change to the original plan is required, since the effect of changes can be safely tested on the ground.

Reusage

Flight spares that go unused in their initial missions are still considered valuable. A 2017 NASA report on flight spare inventory control mentions hundreds of millions of dollars' worth of inventory, not all of it catalogued properly.

New missions for old hardware

Individual spare components manufactured for one mission may eventually fly on another. As a cost-saving measure, the Magellan spacecraft was made largely out such parts:

Reuse type legend

Flight spares on display

Since few space probes return to Earth intact, flight spares are useful for posterity, and may go to museums. The Mariner 10 flight spare is such an example.

References

See also 

 Orbit Replaceable Units
 Spare part

Spacecraft components